The Last Hill, is a 1944 Soviet drama film directed by Iosif Kheifits and Aleksandr Zarkhi.

Plot 
The film tells about five sailors fighting on Malakhov Hill for Sevastopol.

Starring 
 Nikolay Kryuchkov as Cmdr. Boris Likhachyov
 Boris Andreyev as Maj. Zhukovskiy
 Akaki Khorava as Vice-Admiral (as A. Khorava)
 Maria Pastukhova as Mariya Perventsova (as M. Pastukhova)
 Fyodor Ishchenko as Sailor (as F. Ishchenko)
 Nikolay Gorlov as Sailor (as N. Gorlov)
 Yevgeni Perov as Sailor (as E. Perov)
 Igor Tkachuk as Sailor (as I. Tkachuk)
 Zura Lejava as Sailor (as Z. Lezhava)
 Nikolai Dorokhin as Sgt. Sizov (as N. Dorokhin)
 Anatoliy Smiranin as Narrator (voice) (as A. Smiranin)

References

External links 
 

1944 films
1940s Russian-language films
Soviet drama films
Soviet black-and-white films
Films set in Crimea
1944 drama films